Ding Dexing was a Chinese general of the Ming dynasty in service of the Hongwu Emperor.

References

Ming dynasty generals
Year of birth unknown
Year of death unknown
Place of birth unknown
Place of death unknown